Antonio Ernesto "Anton" Floirendo Lagdameo Jr. (born January 22, 1968) is a Filipino politician and businessman serving as the Special Assistant to the President since June 2022 in President Bongbong Marcos' administration. He was the Representative of Davao del Norte's 2nd district from 2007 to 2016. He is married to actress Dawn Zulueta, and is a member of the wealthy Floirendo clan in Southern Mindanao. Lagdameo is a grandson of "banana king" Antonio Floirendo Sr., one of Ferdinand Marcos' cronies, through the former's daughter Linda Floirendo-Lagdameo.

As a public servant, Lagdameo's main focus was on rural and agricultural development, social conservatism, education and lifelong learning, tourism and sustainable development. He is the largest individual donor to the 2022 presidential campaign of Bongbong Marcos, contributing more than ₱240 million to the campaign.

Education
Being innately drawn to business, economics and trade, Lagdameo finished his Bachelor of Business Administration in one of the Ivy League business schools, the Wharton School of the University of Pennsylvania in 1989. In 2016, he was included in the prestigious Penn Notables  list, a roster of alumni, faculty and trustees of the University of Pennsylvania who served outstandingly in foreign government. He continued his education in 1998 at the University of Asia and the Pacific, earning a master's degree in Business Economics.

Business career
Prior to his entry to politics as representative of the second district of Davao del Norte, he was a successful businessman. He was a credit analyst for Manufacturers Hanover Trust in Manhattan, New York from 1989-1992 and after that, of National Westminster Bank in New York for a year. He then became Director of Cambrick Trading Ltd. in London from 1993-1996. He returned to the Philippines and served as the Vice President of Anflo Management & Investment Corp. in Davao from 1996 until 2007.

Political career
Lagdameo was also a member of the Commission on Appointments, an independent body separate and distinct from the Legislature, though composed of members of Congress that acts as a restraint against the abuse of the appointing power of the President by approving only those who are fit and qualified to ensure the efficient and harmonious functioning of the government.

He is the current Special Assistant of President Bongbong Marcos.

Personal life
Lagdameo is married to actress Dawn Zulueta, with whom he has two children, Jacobo Antonio and Ayisha Madlen.

References

External links

1968 births
Living people
Bongbong Marcos administration cabinet members
Lakas–CMD politicians
Members of the House of Representatives of the Philippines from Davao del Norte
People from Davao City
People from Tagum
University of Asia and the Pacific alumni
Visayan people
Wharton School of the University of Pennsylvania alumni